Arise Evans (or Rhys or Rice Evans) (1607–c.1660), was a Welsh prophet and fanatic.

Personal history
Evans was born about 1607 in Llangelynin parish and was apprenticed to a tailor at Wrexham. While living in Wales he had seen visions and prophetic dreams which were accentuated when he went to London in 1629. In London he made vain efforts to warn King Charles I of perceived dangers, but succeeded in telling the Earl of Essex to his face of his future promotions. Evans became interested in the multifarious sects that flourished under the new liberty of Charles I's reign, opposing most of them, especially the tenets of the Fifth Monarchist. He took particular offence towards  Christopher Feake and William Aspinwall.

He was arrested and imprisoned in ~1650 at Newgate Prison for impersonating Christ.

References

External links
  The Bloody Vision of John Farley by Arise Evans at the Ex-Classics Web Site

1607 births
1660 deaths
17th-century Welsh people
Prophets